Salvadore Cammarano (also Salvatore) (born Naples, 19 March 1801 – died Naples 17 July 1852) was a prolific Italian librettist and playwright perhaps best known for writing the text of Lucia di Lammermoor (1835) for Gaetano Donizetti.

For Donizetti he also contributed the libretti for L'assedio di Calais (1836), Belisario (1836), Pia de' Tolomei (1837), Roberto Devereux (1837), Maria de Rudenz (1838), Poliuto (1838), and Maria di Rohan (1843), while for Giuseppe Persiani he was the author of Ines de Castro.

For Verdi he wrote Alzira (1845), La battaglia di Legnano (1849) and Luisa Miller (1849), but after he died in July 1852, Verdi worked with Leone Emanuele Bardare to complete the libretto for  Il trovatore (1853).  Cammarano also started work on libretto for a proposed adaptation of William Shakespeare's play King Lear, named Re Lear, but he died before completing it; a detailed scenario survives.

His father, Giuseppe, was a painter and set-designer. His son, Michele, was also a painter.

Libretti by Cammarano

1834: La sposa (Egisto Vignozzi)
1835: Ines de Castro (Giuseppe Persiani), in collaboration with Giovanni Emanuele Bidera
1835: Un matrimonio per ragione (Giuseppe Staffa)
1835: Lucia di Lammermoor (Gaetano Donizetti)
1836: Belisario (Gaetano Donizetti)
1836: L'assedio di Calais (Gaetano Donizetti)
1836: Eufemio di Messina (Giuseppe Persiani), from an original libretto by Felice Romani
1837: Pia de' Tolomei (Gaetano Donizetti)
1837: Roberto Devereux (Gaetano Donizetti)
1838: Maria de Rudenz (Gaetano Donizetti)
1838: Poliuto (Gaetano Donizetti), first performance 1848
1838: Elena da Feltre (Saverio Mercadante)
1839: I ciarlatani (Luigi Cammarano)
1839:  Il Conte di Chalais (Giuseppe Lillo)
1840: Cristina di Svezia (Alessandro Nini)
1840: Saffo (Giovanni Pacini)
1840:  La vestale (Saverio Mercadante)
1841: Luigi Rolla (Federico Ricci)
1842:  Il proscritto (Saverio Mercadante)
1842:  La fidanzata corsa (Giovanni Pacini)
1843: Maria di Rohan (Gaetano Donizetti)
1843: Il reggente (Saverio Mercadante)
1843: Ester d'Engaddi (Achille Peri)
1843: Il ravvedimento (Luigi Cammarano)
1845: Bondelmonte (Giovanni Pacini)
1845: Alzira (Giuseppe Verdi)
1845:  Il vascello de Gama (Saverio Mercadante)
1845: Stella di Napoli (Giovanni Pacini)
1846:  Orazi e Curiazi (Saverio Mercadante)
1847:  Merope (Giovanni Pacini)
1847:  Eleonora Dori (Vincenzo Battista)
1849: La battaglia di Legnano (Giuseppe Verdi)
1849: Luisa Miller (Giuseppe Verdi)
1850:  Virginia (Saverio Mercadante), first performance 1866
1850:  Non v'è fumo senza fuoco (Luigi Cammarano)
1851:  Malvina di Scozia (Giovanni Pacini)
1851:  Folco d'Arles (Nicola De Giosa)
1851:   (Saverio Mercadante), from an original libretto by Felice Romani
1853:  Il trovatore (Giuseppe Verdi)

References
Notes

Sources
Black, John (1982), Donizetti's Operas in Naples, 1822 to 1848, London: Donizetti Society, 1982
Black, John (1984), The Italian Romantic Libretto: A Study of Salvadore Cammarano, Edinburgh University Press, 1984  
Budden, Julian,  The Operas of Verdi, 2, From Il Trovatore to La Forza del destino . London: Cassell, 1984.  (hardcover);  (paperback).
Warrack, John and Ewan West, The Oxford Dictionary of Opera, Oxford University Press, 1992

External links
Opera at Stanford University

1801 births
1852 deaths
Italian opera librettists
19th-century Neapolitan people
Italian male dramatists and playwrights
19th-century Italian dramatists and playwrights
19th-century Italian male writers